Boguszewo  is a village in the administrative district of Gmina Mońki, within Mońki County, Podlaskie Voivodeship, in north-eastern Poland.

According to the 1921 census, the village was inhabited by 587 people, among whom 572 were Roman Catholic, 7 Orthodox, and 8 Mosaic. At the same time, 580 inhabitants declared Polish nationality, 7 Belarusian and 7 other. There were 91 residential buildings in the village.

References

Villages in Mońki County